Wolry Wolfe (born 12 August 1981) is a Jamaican international footballer who plays professionally for Humble Lions, as a left winger.

Early and personal life
Born in Bodles, Wolfe is the brother of Rafe Wolfe and Kemeel Wolfe, and the cousin of Omar Cummings.

Career

Club career
Wolfe began his professional career in Jamaica in 2000 with Hazard United, and after a brief spell in Trinidad and Tobago with Joe Public, returned to the renamed Portmore United in 2006. After two seasons, Wolfe returned to Joe Public, spending loan spells in Hungary and Australia with Ferencváros and Central Coast Mariners respectively. Wolfe returned to Jamaica in 2009 with Portmore United, moving to Benfica (JAM) in 2010. During the January 2011 transfer window, Wolry Wolfe moved to Humble Lions.

International career
Wolfe earned 14 caps for Jamaica between 2007 and 2009, including in three FIFA World Cup qualifying matches.

References

1981 births
Living people
Jamaican footballers
Jamaica international footballers
Expatriate footballers in Hungary
Expatriate soccer players in Australia
Joe Public F.C. players
Expatriate footballers in Trinidad and Tobago
Central Coast Mariners FC players
Jamaican expatriate sportspeople in Trinidad and Tobago
TT Pro League players
Humble Lions F.C. players
Ferencvárosi TC footballers
Nemzeti Bajnokság I players
Association football wingers
National Premier League players
Jamaican expatriate sportspeople in Hungary